Kim Edward Beazley  (30 September 1917 – 12 October 2007) was an Australian politician who served as a member of the House of Representatives from 1945 to 1977, representing the Labor Party. He was Minister for Education in the Whitlam Government from 1972 to 1975.

Early life and education
Beazley, the youngest of seven children, was born in Northam, Western Australia. He was the son of Alfred Beazley, a storeman and packer, and his wife Mary Wright.

Beazley grew up in Fremantle. He attended the academically selective Perth Modern School (1933–1935), where he topped the state in history and English. He went on to Claremont Teachers College, and first worked as a teacher at the Richmond State School East Fremantle, and then Arthur River, Midland Junction, and Claremont. Beazley later studied politics at the University of Western Australia (UWA), and tutored at Claremont Teachers College and at UWA. He was later to gain an MA from the Australian National University.

Career

Beazley was active in the Labor Party, and the elegance of his writings and the eloquence of his speeches marked him out as a rising star. He served as vice president of the State School Teachers' Union and as a member of the State Executive of the Party.

On the death in office of Prime Minister John Curtin in 1945, the 27-year-old Beazley was preselected for, and won, Curtin's Federal Parliament seat of Fremantle. He was the youngest member of the federal parliament when elected, and was known as "the student prince". He became the Father of the House in 1975, and held his seat until he retired in 1977.

A committed Christian (he was brought up and baptised in the Church of Christ), and member of Moral Rearmament, Beazley was prominent on the right-wing of the Labor Party during the ideological battles of the 1950s and 1960s. He claimed a central role in the events leading to the Labor Party's fateful 1954 split and harboured lifelong regret that he failed to help avert the split when he felt it had been in his power to do so. During the leadership of Arthur Calwell (from 1960 to 1967) he was considered a possible future leader of the party, but his right-wing views, particularly his support for the U.S. Alliance, cost him support, and Gough Whitlam emerged as Calwell's successor.

Beazley was the education minister in the Whitlam Government from 1972 to 1975. Though afflicted with severe illness for part of his tenure, he carried out important reforms in the education field, such as abolishing university fees and introducing needs-based funding for all schools through the Schools Commission. During the 1970s Beazley worked for the United States of America in what a historian has called "a discreet relationship".

Later life and death
After the defeat of the Whitlam Government in 1975, Beazley was elected to the Labor front bench, but resigned when it was revealed that Gough Whitlam and Bill Hartley, with the ALP national secretary, David Combe, had been seeking money from the Iraqi Ba'ath Party to pay for the party's election campaign. He retired from politics in 1977. At the time of his death he was the last parliamentary survivor of the Chifley government, as well as the earliest surviving member of the Commonwealth Parliament. He died in Perth on 12 October 2007, and was accorded a state funeral on 20 October.

His memoirs were published posthumously in February 2009 with a foreword by his son Kim Christian Beazley who himself had a distinguished career as a Labor politician and party leader. The Beazley Medal, annual awards to the top secondary students in WA, were named in his honour.

Kim Edward Beazley's death came almost a year after the death of his other son, David.

Personal life
Beazley married Betty Judge, a fellow teacher, union official and an athlete (she was Australian women's 880 yards champion), on 7 February 1948, at Claremont. They had two sons, including Rhodes Scholar, Deputy Prime Minister and Governor of Western Australia Kim Christian Beazley, and one daughter.

References

External links
Death Notice (The Sydney Morning Herald)

1917 births
2007 deaths
1975 Australian constitutional crisis
Australian Labor Party members of the Parliament of Australia
Members of the Australian House of Representatives for Fremantle
Members of the Australian House of Representatives
Members of the Cabinet of Australia
People educated at Perth Modern School
People from Northam, Western Australia
University of Western Australia alumni
20th-century Australian politicians
Australian memoirists
20th-century memoirists